The Hunter River is a river in the Kimberley region of Western Australia.

The headwaters of the river rise below Donkins Hill. The river flows in a south-westerly direction until it discharges into Prince Frederick Harbour then York Sound and the Indian Ocean.

The river was named in 1820 by the explorer Philip Parker King aboard  while making charts in the area. The river was named after the surgeon on Mermaid, James Hunter.

The river has two spectacular waterfalls, the Hunter Falls and Donkin Falls, both of which drop . Moreover, a large and unusual rock formation is found at the mouth of the river.
The area is popular with tourism companies and several wilderness cruises operate there.

References

Rivers of the Kimberley region of Western Australia